The 1985–86 season was Real Madrid Club de Fútbol's 84th season in existence and the club's 55th consecutive season in the top flight of Spanish football.

Season 
After six years without winning La Liga, Real Madrid Club de Fútbol finally won the title in the 1985–86 season. The team also triumphed in the UEFA Cup, making it a European Double. Following a change in the Chairman office (from Luis de Carlos to Ramón Mendoza), Real Madrid signed new top players (such as Hugo Sánchez, Rafael Gordillo and Antonio Maceda) under manager Luis Molowny, and produced an emphatic season. This was the club's 21st league title in history and its second consecutive UEFA Cup. Real Madrid defeated 1. FC Köln in the final to win the 1985–86 UEFA Cup. The club were eliminated from the Copa del Rey by Real Zaragoza in the semi-finals.

Squad

Transfers

In

 from Real Zaragoza
 from Real Valladolid
 from Real Betis
 from Sporting Gijón
 from Atlético Madrid

Out

 to Real Zaragoza (loan)
 to Real Madrid Castilla
 to Real Zaragoza
 to Racing Santander
 to Cádiz CF
 to Real Madrid Castilla
 to  RSC Anderlecht
 to Cartagena FC
 to Real Madrid Castilla
 to Real Zaragoza
 to  Neuchâtel Xamax FCS

Friendlies

Teresa Herrera Trophy

Santiago Bernabeu Trophy

Competitions

La Liga

Position by round

League table

Matches

Copa del Rey

Round of 16

Quarter-finals

Semi-finals

Copa de la Liga

UEFA Cup

First round

Second round

Third round

Quarter-finals

Semi-finals

Final

Statistics

Squad statistics

Players statistics

See also
La Quinta del Buitre

References

Real Madrid CF seasons
Real Madrid CF
Spanish football championship-winning seasons
UEFA Europa League-winning seasons